Floyd Brown (born 1961) is an American author, speaker, and media commentator.

Floyd Brown may also refer to:
Floyd Brown (athlete) (born 1957), Jamaican sprinter
Floyd L. Brown (born 1888), American college football player and coach
Floyd B. Brown, American educator, owner of the historic Floyd B. Brown House